NorthStar Foundation is an Omaha foundation serving North Omaha’s young males – from third grade to high school graduation – through academic, athletic and adventure programming with the goal of high school graduation and career readiness.

History
The NorthStar Foundation 501(c)(3) was created in August 2007 by Scott Hazelrigg in partnership with the Board of Directors to address some of Greater Omaha’s greatest needs in before and after school programming.

Key statistics include:

 62.3% of Omaha Public School students eligible for free and reduced lunch
 Omaha currently has the greatest percentage of African American children living in poverty in the nation
 Approximately one in four Omaha youth (25.1%) are home alone without adult supervision after school
 Less than one-half of parents reported their youth participated in an organized after school program
 Students ages 12–16 are disengaging and often unmotivated leading to the point where they cease to see education as a vehicle for their future success

Program structure
The NorthStar Foundation is focused on developing an exciting before and after school model that places youth in a safe and secure environment with mentors, staff, and peers, who share common goals that focus on self-reliance, self-actualization, and accountability. At the heart of NorthStar are five program areas of emphasis:

 Academic Achievement
 Athletics & Healthy Lifestyles
 Adventure & Experiential Learning
 Arts Immersion
 Actualization & Employment Readiness

Board of directors
Richard "Dick" Holland, Chairman
J. Robert "Bob" Kerrey, Vice Chair
Scott Hazelrigg, President
Susie Buffett, Secretary
Tim Clark
John "Buzz" Garlock
Ben Gray
Larry Trussell

Notes

External links 

 

Organizations based in Omaha, Nebraska